Latif Abubakar is a playwright and the Chief Executive Director of Globe Production. He founded the organization the Globe Production in 2009 and has worked with notable actors including Ekow Smith-Asante, Adjetey Anang, Clemento Suarez, Ofori Bismarck, Pearl Darkey, Paul Quarcoo and Alexandra Bailey.

Career 
He was the first playwright in Ghana to live stream his play Thank God For Idiots virtually on YouTube amid band on public gathering during the COVID-19 period.

Plays
Thank God for Idiots
Romantic Nonsense
I Can't Think Far
You May Kiss the Corpse
Saint and Sinners
Gallery of Comedies
The Second Coming of Nkrumah
What Can Come Can Come
The Legend Play
Judas and Delilah 1 & 2
Men Don Die
Something must kill a man

Awards
Abubakar won the Tourism and Culture awards for his creative works in arts, culture and entertainment through his plays at the Ghana Tourism Authority.

References

Living people
Ghanaian dramatists and playwrights
Year of birth missing (living people)